The men's 100 metres event at the 1999 Summer Universiade was held on 10 and 11 July at the Estadio Son Moix in Palma de Mallorca, Spain.

Medalists

Results

Heats
Wind:Heat 1: +0.6 m/s, Heat 2: -1.9 m/s, Heat 3: -1.9 m/s, Heat 4: +0.2 m/s, Heat 5: -1.4 m/sHeat 6: -1.3 m/s, Heat 7: -1.9 m/s, Heat 8: -1.0 m/s, Heat 9: -1.4 m/s, Heat 10: -2.0 m/s

Quarterfinals
Wind:Heat 1: 0.0 m/s, Heat 2: 0.0 m/s, Heat 3: m/s, Heat 4: +0.1 m/s

Semifinals
Wind:Heat 1: 0.0 m/s, Heat 2: -1.5 m/s

Final
Wind:
-1.5 m/s

References

Athletics at the 1999 Summer Universiade
1999